Integrity Title Insurance, Trust and Safe Deposit Company is a historic bank building located in the Northern Liberties neighborhood of Philadelphia, Pennsylvania. It was built in 1902, and an addition was built in 1912.  The two-story building is in a German baroque style and has a limestone base with Pompeiian brick and flat stone arches.

It was added to the National Register of Historic Places in 1982.

References

Bank buildings on the National Register of Historic Places in Philadelphia
Commercial buildings completed in 1912
Northern Liberties, Philadelphia
1912 establishments in Pennsylvania